Goodness Nwachukwu (born 6 October 1998) is a Nigerian athlete who specialises in the discus. She won the gold medal in the Women's Discus F42 at the 2022 Commonwealth Games, setting a new world record for the discipline of 36.56m. She broke her own world record of 32.95m, previously set at the 2021 World Para Athletics Grand Prix in Tunis.

References

External links

1998 births
21st-century Nigerian women
Living people
Athletes (track and field) at the 2022 Commonwealth Games
Commonwealth Games competitors for Nigeria
Commonwealth Games gold medallists for Nigeria
Nigerian female discus throwers
Medallists at the 2022 Commonwealth Games